Candiana is a comune (municipality) in the Province of Padua in the Italian region Veneto, located about  southwest of Venice and about  southeast of Padua.

The municipality of Candiana contains the frazione (subdivision) Pontecasale.

Candiana borders the following municipalities: Agna, Arre, Bovolenta, Correzzola, Pontelongo, Terrassa Padovana.

Demographic evolution

References

External links
 www.comunedicandiana.com/

Cities and towns in Veneto